Lochristi is a municipality located in the Belgian province of East Flanders. As of 2021, Lochristi had a total population of 22,621.

Notable people
 
 
 Kwinten Clappaert (born 1988), footballer

Gallery

References

External links
 
 Official website 

Municipalities of East Flanders
Populated places in East Flanders